A vibrating wire sensor measures the opening of a joint from the stretch of a wire being made to vibrate at acoustical  frequency. Since the wire is made of an elastic metal, this kind of sensor can be used as well to measure pulling forces to within a certain range.

The applied external force indeed changes the tension on the wire, this changes the frequency. The frequency is measured and indicates the amount of force on the sensor.  The load sensor has an integrated electronic system to both activate the vibrating wire as well as to read the frequency. This can be compared to a guitar: animating the strings, creates a vibration and a sound. The sound will be dependent on the tension on the strings.

See also 
 Strain Gauge

References

Measuring instruments